Mesquite is a suburban city located east of the city of Dallas, Texas, in the United States. Most of the city is located in Dallas County, though a small portion extends into Kaufman County. As of 2019 census estimates, the population was 140,937, making it the 22nd-most populous city in the U.S. state of Texas; in 2020, its population grew to 150,108. Mesquite is positioned at the crossroads of four major highways (Interstates 30, 635, 20, and U.S. Route 80), making locations such as downtown Dallas, Lake Ray Hubbard, Dallas Love Field, and DFW International Airport accessible.

According to legislative action, the city is the "Rodeo Capital of Texas". In 2016, Mesquite received a Playful City USA designation for the fourth year in a row. The city has been named a Tree City USA by the National Arbor Day Foundation for over 25 years. The city of Mesquite holds the 10th-longest reign in all of Texas.

Unique to suburbs of Dallas and Fort Worth, the city of Mesquite is served by its own local airport, Mesquite Metro Airport. Companies and institutions with a major presence in the city are the United Parcel Service, Sears, AT&T, Charter Spectrum, Eastfield College,  Ashley Furniture, and FedEx.

History

Before settlement 
Centuries before American settlers moved into the area, Mesquite was an open prairie land and a key trading ground for indigenous peoples. The Ionies were a western tribe located close to present-day Fort Worth. The Tawakonies were in present-day Dallas. Finally, the Caddo were the native farmers of the Mesquite land. From 1680 to 1790, after harvest was over, these three tribes held an annual tournament and trading fair.

Settlement 
The city of Mesquite was founded on March 14, 1878, on land along the Texas & Pacific Railway, which ran from Dallas to Shreveport, Louisiana. The locals then named the town after Mesquite Creek. The city was officially incorporated on December 3, 1887, after electing Mayor J.E. Russell.

In the city's earliest years, it was known for many outlaws residing in the area. A prominent outlaw was Sam Bass, historically known for his train robberies in Texas. In 1878, he robbed a train in downtown Mesquite, escaping with $30,000. The Mesquiter, established in 1882 by R.S. Kimbrough, was Dallas County's longest-running newspaper.

Development 
Mesquite prospered through the late 19th and early 20th centuries as a farming community, growing cotton, hay, corn, and sugar, and using the railroad to ship raw goods. The town remained predominantly agrarian until after World War II, when the suburban boom took root in Mesquite.

In 1946, the Mesquite Rodeo was founded by Charlie Columbus McNally, and was one of the only rodeos that had a permanent location. By the mid-1980s, the events were being broadcast by ESPN.

In 1959, Big Town Mall opened as the first air-conditioned shopping mall in the United States. Portions of the Talking Heads movie 'True Stories' were filmed at this mall. The mall was demolished in the summer of 2006, and FedEx opened a logistics center on the property in 2017.

By 1970, the LBJ Freeway (I-635) was constructed, connecting Mesquite to its neighbors, Garland to the north and Balch Springs to the south. Also, in 1971, Town East Mall was constructed. The mall was used by director Ron Howard to film portions of the movie Cotton Candy in 1978. It can also be seen in drive-by footage in the Talking Heads movie 'True Stories', by Talking Heads frontman David Byrne. The mall's associated traffic and shops would continue to grow the town.

In 1986, the Mesquite Arena opened its doors as the new home for the Mesquite ProRodeo. By 1998, the facility was expanded to include a convention center, exhibition hall, and a Hampton Inn and Suites.

By the 1990 census, the city had grown to 101,484 people, up from 1,696 residents in 1950.

In 2011, Mesquite passed a law allowing beer and wine sales in the city. The measure had been considered several times for many years, but was always blocked by strong protest against the proposed sales. It was one of the few cities without beer and wine sales in eastern Dallas County before the law came into effect.

In June 2015, the Mesquite Arts Center added a Freedom Park exhibit, in memorial of September 11. The park displays a  beam that was recovered from the remains of Ground Zero. The Mesquite Fire Department received the beam in 2011.

Geography
Mesquite is located in eastern Dallas County at  (32.782878, −96.609862), with a portion extending east into Kaufman County. The city is bordered to the west by Dallas, to the north by Garland, to the northeast by Sunnyvale, to the south by Seagoville and Dallas, and to the southwest by Balch Springs.

Mesquite is part of the Dallas–Fort Worth–Arlington metroplex, in which one quarter of all Texans live.

Neighborhoods

 Lawson
 Samuell Farms
 Meadow Creek
 Parkview
 Broadmoor Estates
 Old Broadmoor Estates
 Crooked Lane
 Fuentes
 Eastern Heights
 Edgemont Park
 Creek Crossing
 Rutherford
 Falcon's Lair
 Falcon's Ridge
 Pecan Creek
 Rollingwood Hills
 Skyline
 Big Town Estates
 Presidential Estates 
 Pasadena Gardens
 Original Town
 Melton
 Tealwood
 Northridge
 Quail Hollow
 Wildwood
 Valley Creek
 Idle wood
 Meadowview
 Palos Verdes
 hagan hills
 Mesquite Park

Climate
Like most cities in the DFW area, Mesquite has a humid subtropical climate (Köppen climate classification  Cfa) characteristic of the Southern Plains of the United States. It is also continental, characterized by a relatively wide annual temperature range. Located at the lower end of Tornado Alley, Mesquite and the rest of Dallas–Fort Worth are prone to extreme weather.

On average, the warmest month is July. The average coolest month is January. May is the average wettest month.

Demographics

At the 2010 United States census, Mesquite had a population of 139,824. In July 2018, the population was estimated at 142,816. According to the 2020 United States census, there were 150,108 people, 46,586 households, and 34,641 families residing in the city. Per the American Community Survey in 2017, the median age was 32.8.

According to the 2010 census, 64.9% of Mesquite was White (31.5% non-Hispanic white), 25.0% was Black or African American, 0.6% American Indian or Alaska Native, 2.8% Asian, 38.9% of Hispanic or Latino origin, and 3.2% from two or more races. In 2018, 28.6% were non-Hispanic white, 26% Black or African American, 0.8% American Indian or Alaska Native, 2.9% Asian, 0.1% Pacific Islander, 3.4% two or more races, and 40.4% Hispanic or Latino of any race.

At the American Community Survey estimates of 2017, 0.1% of the American Indian population was Cherokee. 1.1% of the city's Asian community was Indian, 0.1% Chinese, 0.6% Filipino, 0.0% Japanese, 0.0% Korean, 0.6% Vietnamese, and 0.3% of other Asian origin. 56 residents were estimated to be Guamanian or Chamorro. The multiracial population of Mesquite was majority White and Black or African American (1.1%), followed by White and American Indian or Alaska Native (0.5%), White and Asian (0.3%), and Black or African American and American Indian and Alaska Native (0.2%). Among the Hispanic or Latino demographic 33.9% were Mexican, 0.7% Puerto Rican, 0.4% Cuban, and 4.0% from other Hispanic or Latin American origins.

Of the 51,578 households at the 2010 census, 39.1% had children under the age of 18 living with them, 48.3% were headed by married couples living together, 18.9% had a female householder with no husband present, and 26.8% were notfamilies. About 22.4% of all households were made up of individuals, and 6.4% were someone living alone who was 65 years of age or older. The average household size was 2.88, and the average family size was 3.38. From 2013 to 2017, an estimated 46,876 households had an estimated 3.06 persons per household. About 57.7% of residents owned houses in Mesquite. The median gross rent was $1,018.

In 2000, the median income for a household was $30,424, and the median income for a family was $36,357. Male full-time workers had a median income of $37,756 versus $29,905 for females. In 2017, the estimated median household income was $52,167.

In 2010, about 29.8% of the population were under the age of 18, 10.1% were 18 to 24 years old, 27.9% were 25 to 44, 23.7% were 45 to 64, and 8.6% were 65 years of age or older in 2010. The median age was 32.3 years. For every 100 females, there were 91.3 males. For every 100 females age 18 and over, there were 86.4 males.

According to information gathered by Sperling's BestPlaces, 62.7% claim religious affiliation. Christianity is the most prevalent religion in Mesquite. The largest Christian body in the city is the Catholic Church, served by the Diocese of Dallas (19.6%), followed by Baptists (13.2%), Methodists (4.8%), Pentecostals (3.1%), Presbyterians (1.6%), Episcopalians (1.0%), Latter-Day Saints (1.0%), Lutherans (0.7%), and 12.4% from another Christian faith including the Oriental Orthodox and Eastern-rite Catholic churches. Mesquite is a center for Indian Christians from the Indian state of Kerala. Their settlement, one of the earliest of the Indian Americans in the DFW area, was influenced by proximity to Dallas-based hospitals such as Baylor University Medical Center at Dallas and Parkland Hospital, as well as having initial low income and difficulties moving to mostly white northern suburbs. The second-largest religion in Mesquite is Islam (3.6%) followed by Judaism (0.7%), and eastern faiths including Hinduism, Sikhism, and Buddhism (0.9%).

Economy 
Much of Mesquite's economy is tied to the city of Dallas with the exception of local businesses. The largest national corporations operating in Mesquite are United Parcel Service, Sears, AT&T, Spectrum, Ashley Furniture, FedEx, OfficeMax, and GameStop. As of Mesquite's 2008 Comprehensive Annual Financial Report, the largest employers in the city are:

Arts and culture 
In 2016, the Mesquite Public Library System was presented with a 2016 Achievement of Library Excellence Award by the Texas Municipal Library Directors Association. Of the 548 public library systems in Texas, the Mesquite Public Library was one of only 43 libraries to earn this prestigious honor. The Mesquite Public Library System consists of two branches to serve the community. Both branches offer traditional and non-traditional programs.

Parks and recreation 

The city houses 76 parks and four recreation centers. The city has been designated a Playful City USA four years running and opened its Heritage Trail system in 2015. The hike and bike trail system consists of 4.25 miles of concrete trails and sidewalks, three trailheads, and other improvements that connect residents from their homes to the Mesquite Golf Club, schools, recreation centers, sports fields, shopping, and more.

Mesquite Golf Club 
Operated by the City of Mesquite, the course is open seven days a week and features a pro shop and driving range.

Mesquite Arts Center 
The  municipal arts facility houses a 494-seat music performance hall, black box theater, rehearsal hall, galleries, and support space. The facility serves as the cultural center for the community and is home to the Mesquite Community Theatre, Mesquite Community Band and the Mesquite Symphony Orchestra.

Government
The city council of Mesquite consists of a mayor and six council members, with Daniel Alemán Jr. serving as mayor and Cliff Keheley as city manager.

The council members of Mesquite's city council are listed below.

Politics

Education

Mesquite Independent School District provides primary and secondary (K–12) education to most areas of Mesquite. A small portion of Mesquite is served by Dallas Independent School District. While another small area in Kaufman County is within the Forney Independent School District, the section has no residents. Mesquite also serves an area of Balch Springs.

In addition to 33 public elementary schools and ten public middle schools, Mesquite is served by five high schools: Mesquite High School, North Mesquite High School, West Mesquite High School, Poteet High School, and John Horn High School. The private Dallas Christian School is located in the city limits.

Colleges and universities

The Texas Legislature defines all of Dallas County (including the vast majority of Mesquite) as being in the Dallas College (formerly Dallas County Community College or DCCCD) district. The portion in Kaufman County is within the Trinity Valley Community College district. Eastfield College provides undergraduate degrees and continuing-education credits as part of Dallas College.

Higher education also is provided by two other institutions. Columbia College-Mesquite Campus is located on the Eastfield College campus. It is a private, nonprofit institution that was founded in Columbia, Missouri, in 1851. It provides bachelor's and master's degree programs.

Media 
Mesquite shares the same television and radio market with Dallas. The Mesquite Independent School District operates KEOM, a high-school sports and classic-hits radio station. The city's newspaper community primarily subscribes to The Dallas Morning News, Al Dia, and other Dallas-based newspapers. The Dallas Morning News has a section dedicated to local news in Mesquite. Star Local News distributes the Mesquite News newspaper.

Transportation
Mesquite is served by a publicly owned and operated airport, Mesquite Metro Airport. The airport includes a  lighted runway with ILS. General aviation accounts for about 75% of daily operations, while commercial aviation accounts for the rest. Mesquite Metro Airport is popular among transient aircraft due to its location near Dallas and favorable fuel prices.

Two other nearby airports, Dallas/Fort Worth International Airport and Dallas Love Field, provide regular commercial passenger service to the region.

Mesquite is not a member of Dallas Area Rapid Transit, but on April 12, 2011, the DART Board changed its policy to permit DART to contract with nonmember cities for services, such as passenger rail and express service. The city and DART staffs have developed a coordinated plan to have a weekday commuter service in operation between the Hanby Stadium visitor parking lot and the DART's Green Line Lawnview Station. This route opened March 12, 2012. The city also has an optional public transportation service where citizens can schedule specific pickup and drop off times and locations within Mesquite through the STAR Transit service.

Union Pacific Railroad operates an intermodal facility for its freight rail service as part of the Skyline Industrial Park. The recent expansion of this intermodal facility won a Silver award in the Industrial Paving Category by the American Concrete Pavement Association.

Highways
  Interstate 20 is a major east–west interstate serving the south side of Mesquite passing through rural and residential areas including the Lawson area. I-20 connects with Balch Springs to the west and Terrell to the east.
  Interstate 30 is a major east–west interstate that passes through the north side of Mesquite. I-30 connects with Dallas, Arlington, and Fort Worth to the west; Garland, Lake Ray Hubbard, and Rockwall to the east.
  Interstate 635 (Lyndon B. Johnson Freeway) is an auxiliary interstate serving as a partial loop around Dallas and its suburbs. I-635 bisects the city of Mesquite and serves as the main freeway through the city as most of the local businesses and attractions (including Town East Mall and Mesquite Championship Rodeo) are built near or around I-635. The interstate connects with Garland to the north and Balch Springs to the south. I-635 also connects Mesquite with Dallas/Fort Worth International Airport.
  U.S. Highway 80 is an east–west freeway passing through north Mesquite. US 80 connects with Sunnyvale, Forney, and Terrell to the east. To the west of Mesquite, the highway merges onto I-30.
  Texas Highway 352  (Military Parkway/Scyene Road) is an east–west highway passing through both west Mesquite and downtown Mesquite. In the downtown area, it is known locally as Main Street on the westbound section and Davis Street on the eastbound section.
 Belt Line Road also passes through Mesquite and serves as a major road. Belt Line road serves as an outer loop around the Dallas suburbs.
 Planning stages and environmental studies are being conducted to expand President George Bush Turnpike to connect from its current terminus at I-30 in Garland to I-20. The new segment of the toll road would pass through Sunnyvale and Mesquite in route to I-20 and would complete the loop around Dallas County.

Notable people

 Jerry Dale McFadden, keyboardist for The Mavericks

 Dave Abruzzese, ex-drummer for Pearl Jam
 Quincy Acy, professional basketball player for Brooklyn Nets and New York Knicks
 Melissa Archer, actress on One Life to Live
 Todd Boatwright, television news anchor
 Craig Wayne Boyd, winner of season seven of NBC's The Voice
 Tarell Brown, professional football player for New England Patriots, played for San Francisco 49ers and Oakland Raiders, and for Texas Longhorns 2005 National Championship team; graduate of North Mesquite High School
 Trevone Boykin, quarterback for Texas Christian University and NFL's Seattle Seahawks
 Joe Bowden, former professional football player for Houston Oilers, Tennessee Titans, and Dallas Cowboys
 John D. Carmack, game programmer and co-founder of id Software Lead programmer of the id computer games Wolfenstein 3D, Doom, Quake, their sequels and the Commander Keen series of games and is the current the CTO of Oculus VR
 Ray Cunningham, former professional baseball player for St. Louis Cardinals
 Alyssa Edwards, drag performer and dance instructor; competed on season five of RuPaul's Drag Race and season two RuPaul's Drag Race: All Stars
 Terry Fator, singer and ventriloquist, winner of America's Got Talent in 2007
 Taylor Gabriel, professional football player for Chicago Bears
 Don Gay, eight-time PRCA world champion bullrider
 Todd Graham, college football coach; head coach at Hawaii
 Jerry Hall, actress and model, former wife of Mick Jagger and mother of four of his children
 Jason Jennings, Major League Baseball player for Colorado Rockies, Texas Rangers
 Micah Xavier Johnson, former soldier of United States Army Reserves and perpetrator of 2016 shooting of Dallas police officers
 Ty Jordan, football player
 Vivian Le, figure skater
 Taylor Lipsett, gold medalist in sled hockey at 2010 Winter Paralympic Games in Vancouver; he led Team USA in goals, with 5 goals in 5 games, and added 2 assists for a total of 7 points
 Sean Lowe, MLB player for Chicago White Sox, St. Louis Cardinals, Pittsburgh Pirates, Colorado Rockies, and Kansas City Royals
 Damien Magnifico, MLB player for Los Angeles Angels, Milwaukee Brewers
 Bryan Massey, actor and writer
 Taylor Parks, actress and singer, best known as Little Inez in 2007 film Hairspray
 Greg Vaughan, actor on General Hospital

Notes

References

External links
 
 

 
1878 establishments in Texas
Cities in Dallas County, Texas
Cities in Kaufman County, Texas
Cities in Texas
Dallas–Fort Worth metroplex
Populated places established in 1878